First Presbyterian Church of Wantage (Old Clove Church) is a historic church in Wantage Township, Sussex County, New Jersey, United States. Church records point to a Dutch Reformed congregation founded in 1788, which merged with First Presbyterian Church of Wantage, founded in 1818. The building is situated on a hill, due south of Clove Brook, a creek from which it derives its common name. It was built in 1829 and added to the National Register of Historic Places on September 23, 1982 for its significance in architecture and religion. The structure is no longer used as a church, but the Friends of Old Clove Church continue an inter-denominational service once annually.

Architecture
The church is Greek Revival with Gothic detailing. The Gothic windows were included as ornament to distinguish the structure as a place of worship. Schools and barns in the area had a similar style and structure. This is the third church building to inhabit the property. The National Register of Historic Places describes the church as a "simple 1 1/2 story rectangular clapboarded frame structure with a four bayside facade and a three bay gable front on a cut stone foundation." The structure remains virtually unchanged since the 19th century. Features include: original floor design, original pews and a balcony that spans three sides of the interior. Two double-leaf entrance doorways on the south side of the structure point to separate entrances for males and females. Pot-bellied stoves and a Victorian chandelier were additions during the churches centennial.

Cemetery
Old Clove Church Cemetery is across New Jersey State Route 23 from the church. Interred here are the remains of several American Revolution and Civil War veterans.

See also
National Register of Historic Places listings in Sussex County, New Jersey

References

Churches on the National Register of Historic Places in New Jersey
Churches completed in 1829
Churches in Sussex County, New Jersey
Presbyterian churches in New Jersey
National Register of Historic Places in Sussex County, New Jersey
Sussex, New Jersey
New Jersey Register of Historic Places